Age of Innocence, also known as Ragtime Summer, is a 1977 Canadian-British   film directed by Alan Bridges and starring David Warner, Honor Blackman and Trudy Young. It is not based on the novel, The Age of Innocence.

Production
Filmed on 35 mm in July and August 1976. Filming locations included Lang Pioneer Village Museum, Burleigh Falls, Lakefield College School, and Lakefield, Ontario.

Plot
In 1921 Canada, a young British man, Henry Buchanan, is a teacher at a local boys' school but his pacifist views, and his record as a conscientious objector during World War I, stir up controversy.

Cast
David Warner as Henry Buchanan
Honor Blackman as Mrs. Boswell
Trudy Young as Clarissa
Lois Maxwell as Mrs. Hogarth
Cec Linder as Dr. Hogarth

Reception

In Directors in British and Irish Cinema: A Reference Companion (2006), Robert Murphy said that the film explored romantic sensibility and sexual repression.

References

External links

1977 drama films
British drama films
Canadian drama films
English-language Canadian films
Films set in 1919
Films set in Ontario
Films shot in Ontario
Films directed by Alan Bridges
1970s English-language films
1970s Canadian films
1970s British films